Ələsgərli is an Azerbaijani name originally derived from the first name Alasgar and may refer to:

Towns & Villages
 Ələsgərli, Shamkir, Azerbaijan
 Ələsgərli, Tartar, Azerbaijan
 Ələsgərli, Füzuli, Azerbaijan

People
Almaz Ələsgərli (Almaz Ələsgərova, Almaz Alasgarli), an Azerbaijani mugham singer and actress.
Nüşabə Ələsgərli (Nushaba Alasgarli), an Azerbaijani singer, pianist, actress and TV presenter.
Müşfiq Ələsgərli (Mushfig Alasgarli), Chairman of the Trade Union of Journalists of Azerbaijan
Ələsgər Ələsgərli (Alasgar Alasgarli) - Head of the Center for Russian-Slavic Studies of the "Turkish Institute of the XXI Century".